Fathullo Boboev (born 9 October 1997) is a Tajikistani professional football player who currently plays for Regar-TadAZ.

Career

International
Boboev made his senior team debut on 16 December 2018 against Oman.

Career statistics

International

Statistics accurate as of match played 13 December 2018

References

External links
 

1997 births
Living people
Tajikistani footballers
Tajikistan international footballers
Association football goalkeepers